Wesley Killing (born January 11, 1993) is a Canadian pair skater. With partner Tara Hancherow, he placed seventh at the 2014 World Junior Championships.

Programs 
(with Ono)

(with Hancherow)

Competitive highlights

With Ono

With Hancherow

Earlier partnerships

References

External links 
 
 

1993 births
Canadian male pair skaters
Living people
People from Woodstock, Ontario
20th-century Canadian people
21st-century Canadian people